The Kings Tower (formerly Kingsway Tower) is a 15-storey mixed-use building located at a junction on Alfred Rewane Road, Ikoyi, Lagos. It was designed by South African architects SAOTA and developed by Sky View Towers Limited. Other facilities include a restaurant and cafe. Completion finalized in 2019.

References

External links
Official website
ITB Profile
SOATA Profile

Mixed-use developments in Lagos
Skyscraper office buildings in Lagos
Office buildings completed in 2019
21st-century architecture in Nigeria